Yesmi Rodríguez Talavera (born 12 April 1994) is a Costa Rican footballer who plays as a midfielder. She has been a member of the Costa Rica women's national team.

International goals
Scores and results list Costa Rica's goal tally first

References

1994 births
Living people
Women's association football midfielders
Costa Rican women's footballers
Costa Rica women's international footballers
Competitors at the 2014 Central American and Caribbean Games